Passalidius fortipes is a species of beetle in the family Carabidae, the only species in the genus Passalidius.

References

Scaritinae